Teichert may refer to:

People 
 Curt Teichert (1905–1996), German-American palaeontologist and geologist
 Jeff Teichert, prominent American lawyer 
 Max-Martin Teichert, (1915-1943), German U-boat commander in World War II
 Minerva Teichert (1888–1976), American painter
 Nancy Weaver Teichert, A graduate of the Indiana University
 Thorsten Teichert (born 1963 in Berlin), German economist

Other 
 Teichert (company)
German toponymic surnames